Trina Rochelle Davis (born 6 September 2001) is an American-born Fijian footballer who plays as a forward for the Fiji women's national team.

Personal life
Davis is eligible to represent Fiji through her mother, who moved to the United States at 22.

Career
Davis made her international debut for Fiji in the 2018 OFC Women's Nations Cup qualification tournament, hosted by Fiji. She scored a hat-trick against Vanuatu in her first match. Davis had arrived in Fiji with the mistaken belief that she'd be training with the national under-17 team, but was instead placed on the senior women's team. Trina Davis signed a national letter of intent with Grambling State University for the 2019/2020 academic year.

In February 2021, Trina Davis signed for Israeli Professional Football Team ASA Tel Aviv University.

Career statistics

International

References

External links
 Profile at oceaniafootball.com

2001 births
Living people
Fijian women's footballers
Fiji women's international footballers
Fijian people of Indian descent
American sportspeople of Indian descent
Women's association football forwards
American women's soccer players
Soccer players from Washington (state)
People from Marysville, Washington
American people of Indo-Fijian descent
Grambling State Tigers
21st-century American women